Chiti is a village in Besisahar Municipality, Lamjung District, Gandaki Pradesh, Nepal.

Chiti may also refer to:
 
 Chiti Mukulu or Chiti the Great, 18th-century King of the Bemba (in modern Zambia)

People with the surname
 Carlo Chiti (1924–1994), Italian racecar driver
 Dom Chiti (born 1958), U.S. baseball coach
 Fabrizio Chiti (born 1971), Italian biochemist
 Gian Paolo Chiti (born 1939), Italian musician
 Harry Chiti (1932–2002), U.S. baseball player
 Patricia Adkins Chiti (died 2018), British singer and musicologist
 Vannino Chiti (born 1947), Italian politician

See also

Chiki
 Chithi (disambiguation)
 Chitti (disambiguation)
 Citti, a surname
 Fondazione Adkins Chiti: Donne in Musica (Chiti Foundation for Women in Music)
 Warang Chiti, the alphabetic script of the Southeast Asian Ho language found in India